Trombly is an unincorporated community in Delta County, in the U.S. state of Michigan.

History
Trombly was named for a local landowner.

References

Unincorporated communities in Delta County, Michigan